Laurent Francis Gabriel Romejko (born 27 December 1963) is a French television host.

Early life
Romejko was born in Meulan, Yvelines.  After being a taxicab driver for a while, he was a graduate of the Ecole Supérieure de Journalisme de Paris. Laurent's family comes from Poland.

TV and radio career
He began by presenting the Minitel of Enfants du rock on Antenne 2 before going on radio (RFM, Autoroute FM). He joined Télématin in 1989 where he presented a column devoted to future jobs. He also presented the weather. In 1991, he presented the magazine Cajou on Canal J and Selecto on Paris Première. On Télématin, he replaced William Leymergie when he was on vacation.

From 1994 to 1999, he presented the weather forecast each morning on RFM. In 2000, he participated in the launch of channel Santé-Vie and hosted a magazine devoted to health professionals. In September 2006, he presented the weather forecast on France 2, replacing Sophie Davant.

He currently hosts Des chiffres et des lettres daily on France 2 (since 1992). In September 2006, the program moved to France 3, but Romejko continued to present it, alongside Arielle Boulin-Prat and Bertrand Renard.

References

External links
"Laurent Romejko, le Monsieur Météo"

1963 births
Living people
People from Meulan-en-Yvelines
French radio presenters
French television presenters
French columnists
French people of Polish descent